Coronavirus is a 2020 Indian Telugu-language thriller drama film about a family exposed to the virus during the COVID-19 lockdown in India. The film was written by Ram Gopal Varma and directed by Agasthya Manju.

Cast 
 Srikanth Iyengar as Anand Rao
 Vamsee Chaganti as Karthik, Anand Rao's elder son
 Kalpalatha as Lakshmi, Anand Rao's wife
 Dakkshi Guttikonda as Rani, Karthik's wife
 Sonia Akula as Shanti, Anand Rao's daughter
 Dora Sai Teja as Rohan, Anand Rao's younger son
 Keshav Deepak as Doctor

Soundtrack 
Music is composed by D.S.R.

See also 
 Impact of the COVID-19 pandemic on cinema
 Corona (film)               * Corona Zombies                           * Songbird                * The Covid Killer

References 

2020 thriller drama films
2020s Telugu-language films
Films about racism
Films about the COVID-19 pandemic
Films directed by Ram Gopal Varma
Indian psychological thriller films
Indian thriller drama films